Boisemont is a commune in the Val-d'Oise department in Île-de-France in northern France.

Education
There is one municipal primary school, École Chasles Le Roux.  it had 56 students. The area secondary schools are Collège La Taillette (junior high school) in Menucourt and Lycée Camille Claudel (senior high school) in Vauréal.

See also
Communes of the Val-d'Oise department

References

External links

Official website 
Association of Mayors of the Val d'Oise 

Communes of Val-d'Oise
Cergy-Pontoise